Alexander Hamilton Willard (1777–1865) was a blacksmith who joined the Lewis and Clark Expedition.

Biography

Origin
Alexander Hamilton Willard Sr. was born in July 1777 in the town Charlestown, New Hampshire,  he was the oldest son of Lt Jonathan Willard and the only child of Betty Caswell. Alexander was the 6th generation Willard born in America from Major Simon Willard's line.

Expedition
Alexander had enlisted in a U.S. Army artillery company in 1800.  During an unsuccessful search for Baker Bay, Willard and George Shannon were ordered to camp out and wait for the main party. While they were sleeping on the beach, a group of Native Americans gathered their guns leaving them unarmed, The main party returned in such a timely manner as to startle the Native Americans into returning the guns.  Although Willard had redeemed himself by this point, he had previously received the harshest punishment distributed to a member of the Corps of Discovery; "Court Martial on the Trail".  The charges were lying down and sleeping at his post while on guard duty: a military crime punishable by death.  The punishment was issued on July 12, 1804, and consisted of 100 lashes divided evenly over four straight days at sunset.

During a portage around the Missouri River Falls in July 1805, Alexander Willard was attacked by a "White Bear", Clark gathered three men and chased the bear off. The island nearby later became known as White Bear Island in memory of that event.
 
In 1806 during his stay at Fort Clatsop, both Willard and William E. Bratton fell ill, although Willard recovered, Bratton did not until after winter.

With the Corps of Discovery, he assisted John Shields as a blacksmith.  In 1808, Meriwether Lewis hired him as government blacksmith for the Sauk and Fox Indians; the following year, he was appointed to the same position for the Delawares and Shawnees. He later served in the War of 1812.

Marriage
Half a year after the completion of the expedition, February 14, 1807, Alexander married Eleanor McDonald. She gave birth to their twelve children. They lived for many years at Platteville, Wisconsin.

Austin James Willard
George Clark Willard
Alexander Hamilton Willard Jr
Eliza Martha Willard
Roland Rudolph Willard
Christiana D. Willard
Joel Willard
Nancy Adeline Willard
Narcissa C. Willard
Eleanor C. Willard
Lewis Augustus Willard
Willis Willard

Death
Alexander Hamilton Willard Sr. died  in March 1865. He is buried in Franklin Cemetery in Franklin, Sacramento County, California.

References

External links
Lewis and Clark Journals, Members of the Expedition (U. Nebraska)
Discovering Lewis and Clark, Alexander Hamilton Willard
Alexander Hamilton Willard Genealogy

1777 births
1865 deaths
Lewis and Clark Expedition people
American military personnel of the War of 1812
Military personnel from New Hampshire
People from Charlestown, New Hampshire
American blacksmiths